Takifugu coronoidus is a species of pufferfish in the family Tetraodontidae. It is a brackish-water species known from China that was first described by Y. Li and C. S. Ni in 1992. In Chinese, the species is known as "晕环多纪鲀", which translates to "halo pufferfish".

References 

coronoidus
Fish of China
Taxa named by Li Chun-Sheng
Fish described in 1992